The Students House is a historic dormitory on 96 Fenway in Boston, Massachusetts.  The house was built in 1913 to a design by the Boston firm of Kilham and Hopkins.  It was built by an organization of local well-to-do Back Bay residents to provide affordable housing to female students attending area schools.  Most of the students housed in its early years attended the New England Conservatory of Music, with its population dominated by other schools after the conservatory opened its own dormitory.  It was sold in 1972 to Northeastern University, which uses it to house freshman students, and is referred to as Kerr Hall.

The building was added to the National Register of Historic Places in 1997.

See also
National Register of Historic Places listings in southern Boston, Massachusetts

References

Houses completed in 1913
Houses in Boston
Fenway–Kenmore
National Register of Historic Places in Boston
University and college dormitories in the United States
1913 establishments in Massachusetts
Buildings and structures on the National Register of Historic Places in Massachusetts